Atroxase is an enzyme. This enzyme catalyses the following chemical reaction

 Cleavage of His5-Leu, Ser9-His, His10-Leu, Ala14-Leu and Tyr16-Leu of insulin B chain

This endopeptidase is present in the venom of the western diamondback rattlesnake (Crotalus atrox).

References

External links 
 

EC 3.4.24